National Council elections are due to be held in Bhutan in April 2023.

Electoral system
The 20 members of the National Council are elected from single-member constituencies using first-past-the-post voting.

References

2023
2023 elections in Asia
2023 in Bhutan
April 2023 events in Asia